AES may refer to:

Businesses and organizations

Companies
 AES Corporation, an American electricity company
 AES Data, former owner of Daisy Systems Holland
 AES Eletropaulo, a former Brazilian electricity company
 AES Andes, formerly AES Gener, a Chilean electricity company
 AES Hawaii, an American electricity company
 American Education Services, part of the Pennsylvania Higher Education Assistance Agency
 Asian Educational Services, an Indian publisher

Schools
 Academy of Environmental Science, in Crystal River, Florida, U.S.
 AES Algiers, in Algeria
 AES Bhausaheb Firodiya High School, in Ahmednagar, India subsidiary in São Paulo, Brazil subsidiary in Chile
 American Embassy School, in New Delhi, India
 Ascension Episcopal School, in Louisiana, U.S.
 Assumption English School, in Bukit Panjang, Singapore

Other organizations
 AES Group, now AES+F, a Russian artist collective
 Amateur Entomologists' Society, a British organisation 
 American Elasmobranch Society, a professional society 
 American Epilepsy Society, an American professional society for epilepsy
 Audio Engineering Society, an American professional society

Science and technology
 Acoustic echo suppression, in telephony
 Advanced electronic signature, an EU-compliant electronic signature system (alternatively AdES)
 Advanced Encryption Standard, or Rijndael, a specification for the encryption of electronic data
 Agricultural experiment station, a scientific research center 
 Algebraic entry system, a calculator input method
 Alkaline earth silicate, a mineral wool
 Application Environment Services, a component of GEM (desktop environment)
 Atomic emission spectroscopy, a method of chemical analysis
 Auger electron spectroscopy, in surface chemistry and materials science
 Automated Enforcement System, a road safety enforcement system in Malaysia
 Automated essay scoring, the use of computers to assign grades 
 Automated Export System, an American exports information system
 AES (Advanced Entertainment System), a version of the Neo Geo
 Automatic Extinguishing System Automatic fire suppression

Other uses
 "Aes", a 1999 song by Skepticism
 AES Railcar, a Chilean railcar 
 Ålesund Airport, Vigra, Norway, IATA airport code AES
 Alsea language, ISO 639-3 code aes
 Alternative Economic Strategy, an economic strategy proposed in the 1970s by British politician Tony Benn
 Actually existing socialism, a catchphrase coined by Leonid Brezhnev to refer to Soviet-style economic planning

See also